Joan W. Nowicke (born 1938) is an American botanist natural from St. Louis, Missouri. She worked 27 years for the Smithsonian Institution, between 1972 and 1999, in the Department of Botany, from the National Museum of Natural History. Nowicke is a global reference as a palynologist, mainly due to her specialization in pollen morphology and its relationship with systematics, in addition to her extensive work in the area of Caryophyllales palynotaxonomy.

In 1989, botanists J.Martínez & J.A.McDonald published Nowickea, a genus of flowering plants from Mexico, belonging to the family Phytolaccaceae and named in her honour.

See also

 Timeline of women in science

References 

1938 births
American women botanists
Living people
21st-century American women